The Governor of Río Negro is a citizen of the Río Negro Province, in Argentina, holding the office of governor for the corresponding period. The governor is elected alongside a vice-governor. Currently the governor of Río Negro is Arabela Carreras.

Governors since 1983

See also
 List of current provincial governors in Argentina
 Legislature of Río Negro

References

Rio Negro Province
Río Negro Province